Tab (alternately referred to as MONSTER MAGNET 25............TAB, Tab 25, or 25 Tab) is the second EP by American rock band Monster Magnet, released in 1991. The EP is generally viewed as Monster Magnet's most psychedelic release, with the first two tracks alone totaling 45 minutes.

Track listing
"Tab..." (Wyndorf/McBain/Cronin) – 32:14
"25 / Longhair" (Wyndorf/McBain) – 12:28
"Lord 13" (Wyndorf) – 4:09
Some Caroline Records versions
"Untitled (Murder)" – 3:38
"Untitled (Tractor)" – 3:25
 2006 reissue
"Spine of God (Live)" - 7:25

Some Caroline Records versions include the songs "Murder" and "Tractor", taken from the band's self-titled debut EP, as hidden bonus tracks.  A March 2006 reissue added a live version of "Spine of God", the studio version of which appeared originally on Spine of God.

Film usage
The 1999 film Beowulf features the track "Lord 13" in its soundtrack. It is played during the ending credits of the film.

Personnel
 Dave Wyndorf – guitar, vocals
 John McBain – guitar
 Joe Calandra - bass
 Jon Kleiman - drums
 Tim Cronin - bass, additional vocals, additional drums

References

Monster Magnet albums
1991 EPs
Caroline Records EPs